In 1971 the Lions toured New Zealand, also playing two matches in Australia. Despite losing the first match to Queensland the tour was a great success, the Lions winning the Test series against the All Blacks. They are still the only Lions side to have won a Test series in New Zealand. The side was captained by John Dawes, coached by Carwyn James and managed by Doug Smith.

Background
Although the Lions had done poorly when touring New Zealand in 1966 (they lost all four Tests to the All Blacks), the seeds had been sown for the successful series of 1971. Wales had won the Grand Slam in the Five Nations Championship in 1971, and appropriately supplied more players than any other home nation to the touring squad. Both the coach and captain were also Welsh. This was the only tour to result in a Lions victory over the All Blacks.

New Zealand, after a long period of success, had lost their most recent series in 1970 away to South Africa.

Key factors
A major factor in their victory was self belief. Gerald Davies explained, "...somewhere along the line it becomes a mental thing...We grew in confidence; we came to believe it was possible to beat the All Blacks." The coaching team had also done important reconnaissance work.

Colin Meads said Mervyn Davies was "the one player who probably had the biggest impact on that 1971 Lions Test series," particularly as he prevented NZ winning line out ball via Brian Lochore.

Test series
The Lions won the first Test in Dunedin 9–3, with a penalty goal to the All Blacks, and two penalties and a try, (scored by Ian McLauchlan) to the Lions. Several Lions players later admitted they were overconfident following their initial Test victory. The Lions were thus convincingly beaten 22–12 in the second Test in Christchurch, with the All Blacks outscoring them five tries (Bob Burgess (2), Sid Going, Ian Kirkpatrick, pen try) to two (Davies (2)). The third Test was played at Athletic Park, Wellington. The Lions did not make the same mistake they had in Christchurch, resulting in a 13–3 win, the Lions scored two converted tries and a drop goal. The All Blacks managed only a try.

Following the third Test the Lions led the series 2–1. The final game played in Auckland would require an All Black victory for New Zealand to draw the series. A draw or Lions victory would give the Lions a series win. Scores were level 8–8 at half time with a try, conversion and penalty each. The first 15 minutes of the second half saw the Lions land a penalty goal and the All Blacks score a try. With the scores tied 11–11, Lions fullback JPR Williams received the ball 45 metres out and attempted a drop goal, it was successful and put the Lions ahead 14–11. Williams's drop goal was the only one he landed in his Test career. The All Blacks could only manage three further points from a penalty to draw the game 14-14, which gave the Lions the series.

Squad

Backs
 John Dawes (London Welsh and Wales) (captain)
 J.P.R. Williams (London Welsh and Wales)
 Bob Hiller (Harlequins and England)
 John C Bevan (Cardiff and Wales)
 Alastair Biggar (London Scottish and Scotland)
 Gerald Davies (London Welsh and Wales)
 David Duckham (Coventry and England)
 Arthur Lewis (Ebbw Vale and Wales)
 John Spencer (Headingley and England)
 Chris Rea (West of Scotland and Scotland)
 Mike Gibson (North of Ireland FC and Ireland)
 Barry John (Cardiff and Wales)
 Gareth Edwards (Cardiff and Wales)
 Chico Hopkins (Maesteg and Wales)
 Chris Wardlow (Northampton and England) was an original selection but withdrew due to injury. His place was taken by Chris Rea

Forwards
 Frank Laidlaw (Melrose and Scotland)
 John Pullin (Bristol and England)
 Ian McLauchlan (Jordanhill College and Scotland)
 Sandy Carmichael (West of Scotland and Scotland)
 Sean Lynch (St Mary's College RFC and Ireland)
 Ray McLoughlin (Blackrock College RFC and Ireland)
 Stack Stevens (Harlequins and England)
 Gordon Brown (West of Scotland and Scotland)
 Geoff Evans (London Welsh and Wales)
 Willie John McBride (Ballymena and Ireland)
 Mike Roberts (London Welsh and Wales)
 Delme Thomas (Llanelli and Wales)
 Mike Hipwell (Terenure College RFC and Ireland)
 Rodger Arneil (Leicester and Scotland)
 Derek Quinnell (Llanelli)
 Fergus Slattery (University College Dublin RFC and Ireland)
 John Taylor (London Welsh and Wales)
 Mervyn Davies (London Welsh and Wales)
 Peter Dixon (Harlequins and England)

Results 

The Canterbury game was particularly violent.

The Test matches

First Test

Second Test

Third Test

NEW ZEALAND: Laurie Mains, Bruce Hunter, Howard Joseph, Wayne Cottrell, Ken Carrington, Bob Burgess (rep Mick Duncan), Sid Going, Brian Muller, Tane Norton, Richie Guy, Colin Meads (c), Brian Lochore, Alan McNaughton Ian Kirkpatrick, Alex Wyllie

LIONS: Williams, Gerald Davies, Dawes (c), Gibson, Duckham, John, Edwards, Lynch, Pullin, McLauchlan, McBride, Brown, Quinnell, Slattery, Mervyn Davies.

In the pack, the Lions selected Gordon Brown over Delme Thomas.

Fourth Test

NEW ZEALAND: Laurie Mains, Ken Carrington, Mick Duncan, Phil Gard, Bryan Williams, Wayne Cottrell, Sid Going, Brian Muller, Tane Norton, Richie Guy, Colin Meads (c), Peter Whiting, Ian Kirkpatrick, Tom Lister, Alex Wyllie

LIONS: Williams, Gerald Davies, Dawes (c), Gibson, Duckham, John, Edwards, Lynch, Pullin, McLauchlan, McBride, Brown, Taylor, Dixon, Mervyn Davies.Thomas replaced injured Brown 60mins

Notes and references

Notes

Bibliography

External links 
 British & Irish Lions | History
 Lions Flashback: 1971 - allblacks.com

1971 rugby union tours
1971
1971
1971 in Irish sport
1970–71 in British rugby union
1971 in New Zealand rugby union
1971 in Australian rugby union